Women's cricket at the 2010 Asian Games was held in Guangzhou, Guangdong, China from 13 to 19 November 2010. In this tournament, 8 teams played.

Squads

Results
All times are China Standard Time (UTC+08:00)

Group round

Pool A

Pool B

Knockout round

Semifinals

Bronze medal match

Final

Final standing

References

Results

External links
Official Website of 2010 Asian Games 

Women